Nikolai Aleksandrovich Stain (born 12 January 1964) is a Russian professional football coach and a former player.

External links
 

1964 births
Sportspeople from Yekaterinburg
Living people
Soviet footballers
Russian footballers
Association football defenders
FC Ural Yekaterinburg players
FC Baltika Kaliningrad players
Russian Premier League players
Russian football managers
FC Zvezda Perm players